The Open Door (La puerta abierta) is a prize-winning 1957 Spanish film based on the 1932 play Tűzmadár by Lajos Zilahy. It was directed by César Fernández Ardavín and stars Amedeo Nazzari and Märta Torén.

Synopsis 
Shortly after settling in Madrid, the body of a murdered dancer appears. His Don Juan condition, in addition to his vanity, make the police suspect that it is a crime of passion. As the investigation continues, the doubts and jealousy of one of his neighbors threaten to damage his family life.

Cast
Amedeo Nazzari as Michel de Caroli
Märta Torén as Countess de Caroli
Rafael de Córdoba as Alomar
Nadia Marlowa as Marietta
Carlos Casaravilla as Police commissioner
Carlos Larrañaga as Pedro
Aurora de Alba as Yolanda
Teresa del Río
Salvador Soler Marí		
Manuel Arbó		
Aníbal Vela		
Vicente Ávila	
Francisco Sánchez		
María del Pilar Armesto		
Julia Pachelo	
Nora Samsó	
José Prada

See also
 (1933), French film based on the play Tűzmadár
The Firebird (1934), American film based on the play Tűzmadár

References

External links
 

1957 films
Spanish drama films
1950s Spanish-language films
Films directed by César Fernández Ardavín
Spanish films based on plays
1950s Spanish films